Verkhovyna Raion is a raion (district) of Ivano-Frankivsk Oblast (region). The urban-type settlement of Verkhovyna is the administrative center of the raion. The raion was reinstated in 1966 (initially in 1939 as Zhabie Raion) out of the Kosiv Raion. Population:

Subdivisions

On 18 July 2020, as part of the administrative reform of Ukraine, the number of raions of Ivano-Frankivsk Oblast was reduced to six, however, the area of Verkhovyna Raion was essentially unchanged. The January 2020 estimate of the raion population was 

Both before and after 2020, the raion consisted of three hromadas:
 Biloberizka rural hromada with the administration in the selo of Biloberizka;
 Verkhovyna settlement hromada with the administration in the urban-type settlement of Verkhovyna;
 Zelene rural hromada with the administration in the selo of Zelene.

Geography
To the west of Verkhovyna Raion lies Zakarpattia Region, while to its east - Chernivtsi Region. To the northwest there lies the Nadvirna Raion and to the northeast - the Kosiv Raion. The biggest river, Cheremosh runs along the Chernivtsi Region and serves as the natural border. Most of the raion is covered with forest.

The raion is located at the extreme south of the Ivano-Frankivsk Region and has a  state border with Romania along the Chyvchyn Ridge. Infrastructure in the raion is underdeveloped and it does not have rail or air connection due to its highland relief. On the other hand it is widely used for mountain tourism and hiking.

Among notable landmarks there is a regional museum of local history "Hutsulshchyna", abandoned Polish Astronomical Observatory Biały Słoń which is used for as a mountain shelter with a small search and rescue team.

The raion is divided into one urban commune (township) and 21 rural communes (councils). It lies in the historical region of Pokuttya.

List of communes
 Verkhovyna (urban-type settlement)
 Vipche (village)
 Bystrets
 Dzembronya
 Biloberizka
 Bukovets
 Cheretiv
 Verkhniy Yaseniv
 Rivnya
 Holovy
 Chorna Richka
 Holoshyna
 Hrynyava
 Bila Richka
 Dovhopole
 Kokhan
 Polyanky
 Zamahora
 Zelene
 Burkut
 Topilche
 Yavirnyk
 Iltsi
 Velykyi Khodak
 Krasnyk
 Krasnoyillya
 Vyhoda
 Kryvopillya
 Volova
 Stayishche
 Kryvorivnia
 Berezhnytsia
 Perekhresne
 Probiynivka
 Hramotne
 Stovpni
 Stebni
 Usteriky
 Khorotseve
 Barvinkiv
 Yablunytsia
 Senkivske
 Cheremoshna

References

 
Raions of Ivano-Frankivsk Oblast
1966 establishments in Ukraine